Mackmin is a surname. Notable people with the surname include:

Anna Mackmin (born 1964), English theatre director
Sara Mackmin (born  1969), British Royal Air Force officer
Scarlett Mackmin, English choreographer

See also
Mackin